When the Going Gets Tough, the Tough Get Going is the second studio album by English new wave band Bow Wow Wow, released in 1983 by RCA Records. The album was produced by Mike Chapman. It is the final album featuring all four original members of the band.

The cover photography was by David Bailey, and the album credits gave "a kiss" to James Honeyman-Scott and John Belushi, both of whom had recently died.

On 25 May 2018, Cherry Red Records released the three-disc set Your Box Set Pet (The Complete Recordings 1980–1984), which included When the Going Gets Tough, the Tough Get Going in its entirety on the second disc, plus eight bonus tracks.

Reception 

Kimberley Leston of Smash Hits commented that When the Going Gets Tough, the Tough Get Going finds Bow Wow Wow playing "with even more haughty panache than usual." Record Mirrors John Shearlaw praised the album as "a jolly, carefree and totally meaningless half hour" that "doesn't pretend to be anything other than completely disposable." Robert Christgau was more critical in The Village Voice, saying that "Mike Chapman adds few if any hooks and Annabella Lwin shockingly little verve to their pattering Afrobeats."

In a retrospective review, Tom Demalon of AllMusic called the album "a well-polished, well-executed effort that holds some surprises mainly in the fact that there is more diversity than on prior Bow Wow Wow records." By contrast, J. D. Considine dismissed it as "slick" and "empty" in The Rolling Stone Album Guide.

Track listing

Charts

References

External links 
 
 

1983 albums
Bow Wow Wow albums
Albums produced by Mike Chapman
RCA Records albums